In England and Wales the Law Commission is an independent law commission set up by Parliament by the Law Commissions Act 1965 to keep the law of England and Wales under review and to recommend reforms.  The organisation is headed by a Chairman (currently Sir Nicholas Green, a judge of the Court of Appeal) and four Law Commissioners.  It proposes changes to the law that will make the law simpler, more accessible, fairer, modern and more cost-effective.  It consults widely on its proposals and in the light of the responses to public consultation, it presents recommendations to the UK Parliament that, if legislated upon, would implement its law reform recommendations. The commission is part of the Commonwealth Association of Law Reform Agencies.

Activities
The Law Commissions Act 1965 requires the Law Commission to submit "programmes for the examination of different branches of the law" to the Lord Chancellor for his approval before undertaking new work.

Every three or four years the Law Commission consults widely, asking for suggestions for projects to include in these programmes.

Decisions about whether to include a project are based on:

 the strength of the need for law reform
 the importance of the issues it will cover
 the availability of resources in terms of both expertise and funding
 whether the project is suitable to be dealt with by the independent Commission.

The Law Commission can also take on additional projects that are referred directly by Government departments.

At any one time, around 15 to 20 areas of law will be under review.  Law Commission projects cover a wide range of subjects that belong to the criminal law, property law, family and trust law, public law, commercial law.

The Law Commission has a rolling programme of law reform projects, and every three years or so it consults on any new projects that should be added to the list of those that it already has under way. In December 2017 it published its 13th Programme of Law Reform.

Approximately 70% of the Law Commission's law reform recommendations have been enacted or accepted by Government.

Current commissioners
The current commissioners are:
Professor Sarah Green
Professor Nicholas Hopkins
Professor Penney Lewis
Nicholas Paines KC

Chairs
The chair of the Law Commission is usually a High Court judge. Chairs are often promoted to the Court of Appeal. Until 2008, promotion would occur soon after or shortly before the end of their term as chair, with one exception: Mr Justice Cooke (whose term as chair ended with his death in 1978). Mr Justice Etherton was promoted to the Court of Appeal approximately two years into his term. The most recent incumbents were appointed near the beginning of their terms.
Leslie Scarman (1965–1973)
Samuel Cooke (1973–1978)
Michael Kerr (1978–1981)
Ralph Gibson (1981–1985)
Roy Beldam (1985–1989)
Peter Gibson (1990–1992)
Henry Brooke (1993–1995)
Mary Arden (1996–1999)
Robert Carnwath (1999–2002)
Roger Toulson (2002–2006)
Terence Etherton (2006–2009)
James Munby (2009–2012)
David Lloyd Jones (2012–2015)
David Bean (2015–2018)
Nicholas Green (2018–present)

See also
Law reform
Scottish Law Commission

References

External links
Law Commission website
ePolitix - Interview with Law Commission chair Roger Toulson - 31 January 2006

Law of the United Kingdom
Non-departmental public bodies of the United Kingdom government
England and Wales
England and Wales
Law reform in the United Kingdom
Legal organisations based in Wales